The 2013 STP Gas Booster 500 was a NASCAR Sprint Cup Series stock car race held on April 7, 2013, at Martinsville Speedway in Ridgeway, Virginia, United States. Contested over 500 laps on the 0.526-mile (0.847 km) oval, it was the sixth race of the 2013 Sprint Cup Series championship. Jimmie Johnson of Hendrick Motorsports won the race, his record eighth win at the track, and second win of the season, while Clint Bowyer finished second. Jeff Gordon, Kasey Kahne and Kyle Busch rounded out the top five.

This is the first NASCAR race since 2005 UAW Ford 500 without 4-time Martinsville winner Denny Hamlin

Report

Background

The track's turns are banked at eleven degrees, while the front stretch, the location of the finish line, has a zero-degree banking. Like the front stretch, the back straight away also doesn't have a banked surface.

Before the race, Dale Earnhardt Jr. was leading the Drivers' Championship with 199 points,  while Brad Keselowski stood in second with 187 points. Jimmie Johnson followed in the third position, 19 points ahead of Carl Edwards and Greg Biffle in fourth and fifth. Kyle Busch, with 163, was four points ahead of Kasey Kahne and nine ahead of Paul Menard, as Joey Logano was one point ahead of Denny Hamlin and five ahead of Matt Kenseth in tenth and eleventh. Ricky Stenhouse Jr. completed the first twelve positions with 139 points. The defending winner of the race was Ryan Newman, who won the race in 2012.

Practice and qualifying

Three practice sessions were scheduled before the race. The first session, held on April 5, 2013, was 90 minutes long. The second and third were scheduled on April 6, and were 45 and 60 minutes long. During the first practice session, Johnson was quickest with a time of 19.214 seconds, ahead of Juan Pablo Montoya and Clint Bowyer in second and third. Jeff Gordon followed in the fourth position, ahead of Keselowski in fifth.

In the Saturday morning session, Bowyer was quickest, ahead of Kyle Busch and Gordon in second and third. Brian Vickers and Newman followed in the fourth and fifth positions. Jamie McMurray, Biffle, Jeff Burton, Martin Truex Jr., and Kevin Harvick rounded out the first ten positions. In the final practice session for the race, Bowyer was quickest with a time of 19.518 seconds. Johnson followed in second, ahead of Edwards and Biffle in third and fourth. Burton, who was eighth-quickest in second practice, managed fifth.

During qualifying, forty-four cars were entered, meaning only one car was not able to start because of NASCAR's qualifying procedure. Johnson clinched his thirtieth career pole position, with a time of 19.244 seconds. After his qualifying run, Johnson commented, "In the first run out, we were in (qualifying) trim and made two or three laps, and I knew right away that we had a great shot at it today. At that point, I just needed to do my job and not mess up." He was joined on the front row of the grid by Marcos Ambrose. Vickers qualified third, Logano took fourth, and Kahne started fifth. Gordon, Keselowski., Kenseth, Newman, and Edwards completed the first ten positions on the grid. The driver who failed to qualify for the race was Mike Bliss.

Race

Start
The race was started at 1:13 p.m. EST. as Marcos Ambrose led the field to the green flag.  A couple of laps later, the first caution came out when Danica Patrick spun in Turn 3.  The race restarted on lap 22 as Jimmie Johnson led on the first restart.  The second caution came out on lap 70 for Scott Speed, who was stopped on the front stretch.  Juan Pablo Montoya won the free pass under caution.  The race restarted on lap 77, with Jimmie Johnson the race leader.

Second Quarter
On Lap 173, the third caution came out for debris on the track.  The race restarted on lap 180 and immediately the fourth caution came out for a multi-car wreck on the back straightaway. Jamie McMurray, Marcos Ambrose, and others were involved.  The race restarted on lap 197.  On lap 246, the fifth caution came out for a crash.  The race restarted on lap 248.  A few laps later, the sixth caution came out with 244 laps to go. Carl Edwards spun out in Turn 4.  The race restarted with 239 laps to go, with Matt Kenseth in the lead.

Third quarter
The seventh caution came out for Martin Truex Jr. who spun on the track with 219 laps to go.  The race restarted with 213 laps to go.  The eighth caution came out for the spin of Kurt Busch with 206 laps to go.  The race restarted with 201 laps to go.  Kyle Busch led the field to the green.  The ninth caution came with Ryan Newman cutting a front tire.  The race restarted with 131 laps to go.  The tenth caution came out with 51 laps to go when Brian Vickers spun out on the back straightaway.  Paul Menard won the free pass under caution.  The race restarted with 41 laps to go.

Fourth quarter
The eleventh caution came out with 33 laps to go when Dale Earnhardt Jr. spun out in Turn 4.  The race restarted with 27 laps to go.  With 13 laps to go, the twelfth caution came out when Kurt Busch caught fire on the front straightaway.  The race was red flagged for more than six minutes for clean up.  The race restarted with 7 laps to go.  Jimmie Johnson won his eighth race at Martinsville.

Results

Qualifying

Race results

Standings after the race

Drivers' Championship standings

Manufacturers' Championship standings

Note: Only the first twelve positions are included for the driver standings.

References

MEAC Virginia
STP Gas Booster 500
STP Gas Booster 500
NASCAR races at Martinsville Speedway